Lawki may refer to the following things:
Ławki, Łódź Voivodeship (central Poland)
Ławki, Łuków County in Lublin Voivodeship (east Poland)
Ławki, Tomaszów Lubelski County in Lublin Voivodeship (east Poland)
Ławki, Masovian Voivodeship (east-central Poland)
Ławki, Greater Poland Voivodeship (west-central Poland)
Ławki, Braniewo County in Warmian-Masurian Voivodeship (north Poland)
Ławki, Giżycko County in Warmian-Masurian Voivodeship (north Poland)
Life as We Knew It a young adult science fiction novel by American author Susan Beth Pfeffer